Marienborn is a village and a former municipality in the Börde district in Saxony-Anhalt, Germany. Since 1 January 2010, it has been part of the municipality of Sommersdorf. The historic pilgrimage centre near the former inner German border is known for the preserved Helmstedt-Marienborn border crossing, now a memorial site.

In 1191 Wichmann von Seeburg, then Archbishop of Magdeburg, established an asylum at the site of an apparition of the Virgin Mary and a spring (Born) with healing waters, which during the 13th century evolved into a monastery for Augustinian nuns. The sisters of Marienborn abbey left a monastery church and cloister with foundations from about 1200, while the pilgrimage chapel at the spring is a replica dating from the 19th century.

Transportation

Marienborn has access to the Bundesautobahn 2 and the Bundesstraße 1 federal highway. The former railway border crossing at Marienborn station today is a stop on the railway line from Braunschweig to Magdeburg, served by Regionalbahn trains of the Deutsche Bahn company.

External links
 Marienborn pilgrimage site

Former municipalities in Saxony-Anhalt
Börde (district)